Robert Paris is a footballer.

Robert Paris may also refer to:
Robert Paris (bef. 1487–c. 1550), English politician
Bob Paris (b. 1959), American writer, activist, actor and former bodybuilder
Rob "Blye" Paris, Canadian rapper
Robert Parys (d. 1408), English politician

See also
Count Robert of Paris, an 1832 novel by Walter Scott
Robert of Paris, a 12th-century cardinal-prebyster of Sant'Eusebio in Rome